Private Lies is a 2001 drama film directed by Sherry Hormann. It was made for German television.

Premise
A housewife and mother tires of her husband and falls under the spell of her handsome neighbor.

Cast
 Martina Gedeck as Sarah
 John Corbett as David
 Vyto Ruginis as Bob
 Marianne Sägebrecht as Betty
 Rosemarie Fendel as Emma
 Margaret Colin as Ellen
 Kevin Chapman
 Peter Gerety

External links
 

2001 films
2001 television films
German television films
Austrian television films
Swiss television films
2000s German-language films
German-language television shows
Films directed by Sherry Hormann
2001 drama films
Films set in the United States
Das Erste original programming